Lady Amanda Patricia Victoria Ellingworth (née Knatchbull; born 26 June 1957), styled The Honourable Amanda Knatchbull between 1957 and 1979, is a British social worker. Her earlier career was in UK social work, specialising in children's services and child protection. She has since held a portfolio of chair roles or directorships, working with vulnerable people, especially children. Among other organisations she is currently a director of Plan International, Barnardo's, and Great Ormond Street Hospital. Her previous roles include:  Chair of The Caldecott Foundation, chair of The Guinness Partnership, founding chair of Guinness Care and Support, and Deputy Chair of Yeovil Hospital.

The granddaughter of Admiral of the Fleet Louis Mountbatten, 1st Earl Mountbatten of Burma, she is a descendant of Queen Victoria through her daughter Princess Alice, Mountbatten's grandmother.

Early life and education
Ellingworth was born in London, the fifth of eight children of the 7th Baron Brabourne and the 2nd Countess Mountbatten of Burma. She is the granddaughter of Admiral of the Fleet the 1st Earl Mountbatten of Burma, who was an uncle of Prince Philip, Duke of Edinburgh and a second cousin once removed of Queen Elizabeth II. She has five brothers and one sister.

She was baptised by the Archbishop of Canterbury on 29 September 1957 at Mersham Parish Church in Mersham, Kent. Her godparents were Prince George of Hanover, Mrs. E. Heywood-Lonsdale, and Mrs. C. H. W. Troughton.

Ellingworth earned a BA Hons degree from the University of Kent, a CQSW qualification from Goldsmiths College, London, and a Certificate in Mandarin Language from the Beijing Language Institute.

Career
After a first career as a social worker, Ellingworth has worked at a senior level in health services, children's services, adult social care and affordable housing. She currently holds several non-executive directorships, including Chair of The Guinness Partnership, a provider of affordable housing.

Personal life

Marriage and family
Lady Amanda married novelist and property entrepreneur Charles Vincent Ellingworth on 31 October 1987; he is the eldest child of six of a Leicestershire Catholic family, who attended Ampleforth College and later read history at Oxford University. They have three sons, Luke (27 January 1991, London), Joseph (2 December 1992, Salisbury) and Louis (25 October 1995, Salisbury).

Relationship with Prince of Wales
Ellingworth's grandfather Lord Mountbatten recommended her as potential bride for his grandnephew, Charles, Prince of Wales. According to his biographer, Jonathan Dimbleby, "In 1974, following his correspondence with Mountbatten on the subject, the Prince had tentatively raised the question of marriage to Amanda with her mother (and his godmother) Patricia Brabourne. She was sympathetic, but counselled against raising the issue with her daughter, who had yet to celebrate her seventeenth birthday."

Mountbatten intended for himself and Lady Amanda to accompany Prince Charles on his planned 1980 tour of India. Both fathers disapproved and it was decided he should go alone. Before Prince Charles was to depart, Mountbatten was assassinated by the IRA in August 1979. When Prince Charles returned, he proposed to Lady Amanda. However, in addition to her maternal grandfather, she had lost her paternal grandmother and youngest brother Nicholas in the attack and now recoiled from the prospect of becoming a member of the royal family.

References and notes

External links 
 .

1957 births
Living people
British people of German-Jewish descent
British women
Amanda
Daughters of barons
Daughters of British earls
Place of birth missing (living people)
Alumni of the University of Kent
Alumni of Goldsmiths, University of London